Kim Tae-woo (born 15 April 1971) is a South Korean actor. After his breakthrough in blockbuster war film Joint Security Area, Kim became best known for his leading roles in arthouse films, such as those directed by Hong Sang-soo, namely Woman Is the Future of Man, Woman on the Beach, and Like You Know It All.

Filmography

Film

Television series

Music video
 "Seesaw" (Hot Potato, 2010)
 "Late Regrets" (Bobo, 2001)

Theater
The Blue Room (2011)
The Seagull (2008)

Awards
2015 KBS Drama Awards: Excellence Award, Actor in a Serial Drama (The Jingbirok: A Memoir of Imjin War)
2006 Busan Film Critics Awards: Best Supporting Actor (Woman on the Beach)
2002 SBS Drama Awards: Excellence Award, Actor in a Serial Drama (That Woman Catches People)
2001 Golden Cinematography Awards: Best New Actor (Joint Security Area)
1998 KBS Drama Awards: Best New Actor (Lie)

References

External links

Male actors from Seoul
South Korean male film actors
South Korean male television actors
South Korean male stage actors
Chung-Ang University alumni
1971 births
Living people